José Evangelista (5 August 1943 – 10 January 2023) was a Spanish composer and music educator who was based in Montreal, Canada. He was professor of composition at the Université de Montréal from 1979 to 2009. A member of the Canadian League of Composers, the Sociedad General de Autores y Editores, and an associate of the Canadian Music Centre, Evangelista was known for his commitment to contemporary classical music and non-Western music.

Life and career
Born in Valencia on 5 August 1943, Evangelista began his professional training at the University of Valencia where he studied computer science for seven years and earned a degree in that subject in 1967. At the same time he pursued music courses at the Valencia Conservatory and earned a premier prix in music composition there in 1967. His most influential teacher at that school was Vicente Asencio who taught harmony, composition, and orchestration.

In 1969 Evangelista moved to Canada and settled in the city of Montreal. From 1970 to 1973 he was a pupil of André Prévost at the Université de Montréal where he earned a Master of Music in composition. In 1974, he attended the Darmstädter Ferienkurse for contemporary music, and returned in 1984 when he was named a composer-in-residence. In the autumn of 1974 he entered the graduate music program at McGill University to study composition with Bruce Mather; he earned a Doctor of Music in 1984. From 1979 he taught on the music faculty of the Université de Montréal; among his students were composers Simon Bertrand, Analia Llugdar, Samy Moussa and Ana Sokolovic. He installed a workshop of Balinese Gamelan music at the university. He held the teaching position until 2009. 

Evangelista was active in Canada with the Traditions musicales du monde, a concert society dedicated to promoting non-Western music which he helped found. He developed an interest in the music and culture of Southeast Asia, and a number of his compositions reflect that interest. To pursue studies in this music, he lived in Indonesia during the summers of 1976 and 1980 and in Burma during the summer of 1986 where he studied the Javanese gamelan and Burmese piano. He was made composer-in-residence at the Akademi Musik Indonesia in Yogyakarta in 1986. In 1993 and 1994, he was composer-in-residence with the Orchestre symphonique de Montréal. 

Evangelista died on 10 January 2023, at age 79.

Awards
In 1974 Evangelista was awarded first prize in the Confederación Espanola de Cajas de Ahorros Contest in Madrid for his En guise de fête. In 1978 he helped found Les Événements du neuf, a concert society dedicated to avant-garde music. In 1982 he was awarded a special prize from Spain's Ministry of Culture for his work Vision, and in 1988 he won first prize in the choral works competition of St Mary Magdalene's Church in Toronto for O quam suavis est. His Nuevas monodías españolas was nominated as classical composition of the year at the Juno Awards of 2005. In 2019, he received the Émile-Nelligan Foundation's Serge-Garant Prize for his life's work.

Works
Evangelista's works include:

 Sonatine for flute and piano, 1971
 Un mur à peine for soprano and eight musicians, 1972
 En guise de fête for soprano and chamber ensemble, 1974
 Monsieur Plume, un homme paisible for soprano and cello, 1974
 Arabesco for voice and cello, 1975
 Coros tejiendo, voces alternando for 12 voices, 1975
 Miroir fugace for string orchestra, 1975
 Va-et-vient for soprano, flute, clarinet and electric organ, 1976
 Consort for three voices, two harps and strings, 1977
 Immobilis in mobili for three winds, three strings, two pianos and percussion, 1977
 Carrousel for ondes Martenot and vibraphone, 1978
 Vent d'est, ballet, 1979
 Motionless Move für three winds four strings, harp, keyboard, percussion, two synthesizers and electric guitar, 1980
 Pentagramme, ballet, 1980
 Rainbow, ballet, 1981
 Light and Shade for 11 musicians, 1981
 Ay, luna for mixed choir, 1981
 Brisé for guitar, 1982
 Vision for mezzo-soprano, piano, harp, electric guitar, cello and vibraphone, 1982
 Clos de vie for piano, harp, harpsichord, electric guitar, banjo, four strings and vibraphone, 1983
 Kotekan for mixed choir, 1983
 Rodolphe, ballet, 1983
 Duo staccato for violin and piano, 1984
 Rondo for lute ensemble, 1984
 Éléphant dans le noir for small orchestra, 1985
 Piano concertant for piano and orchestra, 1986
 Dans la nuit for harp, synthesizer, vibraphone and marimbaphone, 1986
 Merapi for two winds, three strings, harp and vibraphone, 1986
 Nocturn i Albada for guitar, 1986
 Dum esset rex for mixed choir, 1986
 O quam suavis est for mixed choir, 1987
 Ecos for organ, 1987
 La Porte, monodrama for soprano and percussion, 1987
 Monodas españolas for piano, 1988
 Monody Quartet for chamber ensemble, 1989
 O Bali for chamber ensemble, 1989
 Alice & friends, 1990
 Airs d'Espagne, 1992
 Symphonie minute, 1994
 Alap & gat, 1998
 Exercices de conversation, opera, to a libretto by Eugène Ionesco, 2000
 Cancionero, 2001
 Concertino, 2001
 Manuscrit trouvé à Saragosse, opera, 2001
 Concerto con brio for strings, 2004

References

External links
 
 Les Événements du neuf thecanadianencyclopedia.ca
 Rodriguez, Adrian: José Evangelista – Composer in Constant Evolution (interview) myscena.org 10 October 2017
 José Evangelista (biography) Centre de Documentation de la Musique Contemporaine

1943 births
2023 deaths
Spanish male composers
McGill University School of Music alumni
Université de Montréal alumni
Academic staff of the Université de Montréal
University of Valencia alumni
Spanish expatriates in Canada
Composers from the Valencian Community